James Stark (1880– ? ) was a Scottish footballer who played for Rangers, Chelsea, Morton and Scotland. He played at centre half.

Career
Stark joined Rangers from Junior side Glasgow Perthshire in May 1900. He had seven successful years at Ibrox, winning the Scottish Football League twice (1900–01 and 1901–02) plus a Scottish Cup (1902–03) and two Glasgow Cups (1900–01, 1901–02), and was captain when they won the Glasgow International Exhibition Cup in 1901.

He moved to Chelsea in 1907, returning to Rangers a year later, but with no further major honours won in his two-season second spell there. He finished his career as a first-team regular at Morton, winning his last honour, the War Fund Shield, in one of his final appearances in 1915.

Stark also won two Scotland caps in 1909 and was captain of the side for both matches. He was selected twice by the Scottish League XI.

See also
List of Scotland national football team captains

References

External links

1880 births
Footballers from Glasgow
Association football central defenders
Chelsea F.C. players
Glasgow Perthshire F.C. players
Greenock Morton F.C. players
Rangers F.C. players
Scotland international footballers
Scottish Football League players
Scottish Football League representative players
Scottish footballers
English Football League players
Year of death missing
Place of death missing
Date of birth missing
Scottish  Junior Football Association players